The Potez 34 was a recording breaking aircraft, designed and built in France in the late 1920s. Only one was completed.

Design and development
The Potez 34 was built by Aéroplanes Henry Potez and was derived from the Potez 28M and used the Ryan NYP's blind flying /  periscope configuration.

Intended to win the distance record in closed circuit and then in a straight line, the first record attempts of the Potez 34 were punctuated by tyre punctures and oil leaks. Modifications were made including the exchange of the Farman engine with a lighter Hispano-Suiza and the adoption of a metal propeller. On 18 June 1929, the French distance in closed circuit record was beaten over a course of  flown by Lionel de Marmier and Louis Favreau, but the world record could not be broken due to a technical failure. On 25 June 1929, the same crew attempted to break the distance record in a straight line, flying to the Far East, but propeller vibrations necessitated a landing in Tunisia and the failure of the attempt.

The Potez 34 was lent by the Ministere de l'Air to Joseph Le Brix, assisted by Maurice Rossi, for a flight from Paris to Saigon, with three stops at Benghazi, Basra and Allahabad. The attempt began 16 December 1929 and a breakdown occurred over Burma on the night of 22 to 23 December 1929, the aircraft crashed into the jungle but the crew parachuted to safety.

Variations 
34.1 Farman Engine 12 We
34.2 Hispano-Suiza engine 12 Lbr

Users 
 
Armée de l'Air

Specifications

References

1920s French experimental aircraft
034
Aircraft first flown in 1928
High-wing aircraft
Single-engined tractor aircraft